This is a list of seasons completed by the Detroit Tigers. They played in the Western League from their inception in 1894 to the 1900 season; in 1900, the league changed its named to the American League and became a major league in 1901. The Tigers have completed 122 seasons in Major League Baseball, qualifying for the postseason sixteen times and reaching the World Series eleven times (1907-1909, 1934, 1935, 1940, 1945, 1968, 1984, 2006, 2012) with four world championships (1935, 1945, 1968, 1984).

Through the efforts of team executive (and future owner) Frank Navin, the Tigers acquired a handful of talent in the first decade of the 20th century that would bear results. In 1905, the Tigers acquired Ty Cobb to join a team that had steadily acquired players of talent such as Sam Crawford, Hughie Jennings and Bill Donovan (the former two and Cobb would each reach the Hall of Fame). Cobb would play 21 years with the Tigers, and they would reach the World Series three times during his era, although they would lose each time. The end of the Cobb era in 1926 opened up a period of rebuilding that bore fruit in 1934 with a quartet of future Hall of Famers in Hank Greenberg, Goose Goslin, Charlie Gehringer, and Mickey Cochrane (they acquired the latter two in a 1934 trade). That year, they went 101–53 (with a winning percentage of .656) and won the pennant. They lost in the ensuing World Series but returned the following year after going 93–58. They lost Greenberg in Game 2 due to injury but persevered over the Chicago Cubs to win their first world championship.

After the death of Navin in 1935, Walter Briggs Sr. (a part-owner since 1919) took over as primary owner, which he would operate until his death in 1952. The Tigers toiled in mediocre play until their next pennant in 1940 while Greenberg won his second MVP award, although the Tigers lost in seven games. World War II meant that Greenberg would be away from 1941 to 1944 due to service, and the Tigers regressed despite the efforts of pitchers such as Hal Newhouser, who won the MVP Award in 1944 and 1945 (the only pitcher to win back-to-back MVP Awards). Greenberg and others would return in 1945 to help the Tigers narrowly win the AL pennant with an 88–65 record. Facing the Cubs, they won in seven games. While the Tigers would do well in the remainder of the decade while adding a future Hall of Famer in George Kell, they would not win another pennant for seventeen years (with the 1950s resulting in seven losing seasons). Briggs Sr was succeeded by his son Jr, but he would sell the team to John Fetzer and Fred Knorr in 1956. Al Kaline made his debut on the roster in 1953 and became a mainstay for the next two decades. The 1960s brought some needed sparkplug players such as Norm Cash, Willie Horton, Mickey Lolich and Denny McLain. The Tigers won 101 games in 1961 but fell short of the pennant by eight games. Six years later, they finished one game short of the Boston Red Sox for the pennant after losing the last game of the year. The following year, they would take hold of the pennant with 103 victories while McLain won the MVP Award and the Cy Young Award. In the final Series played before the division era, the Tigers defeated the St. Louis Cardinals in a classic seven game series that saw them come back from a 3-1 series deficit. A gradual decline over the next decade was followed by the hiring of Sparky Anderson in 1979, for which he led them to the 1984 World Series championship; he retired in 1995. The next decade brought plenty of losing before manager Jim Leyland and rookie pitcher Justin Verlander helped bring them back to prominence. The Tigers would reach the World Series that year but lost in five games; they would win four consecutive division titles from 2011 to 2014 (led by Miguel Cabrera) and reach the World Series in 2012, which they lost in a sweep.

Through 122 seasons of baseball, the Tigers have recorded 71 seasons at .500 or better, 69 of which have been winning campaigns.

Record season-by-season 
The following table describes a season-by-season listing of the Tigers win–loss record.

Record by decade 
The following table describes the Tigers' MLB win–loss record by decade.

Postseason record by year
The Tigers have made the postseason sixteen times in their history, with their first being in 1907 and the most recent being in 2014.

Best seasons in Detroit Tigers history

Worst seasons in Detroit Tigers history

See also
History of the Detroit Tigers

References

External links
 Tigers Year-By-Year Results at MLB.com
 Tigers Postseason Results at MLB.com

 
Detroit Tigers
Seasons